Yang Zhixian is a Chinese swimmer who competes in the Men's 400m individual medley. At the 2012 Summer Olympics he finished 12th overall in the heats in the Men's 400 metre individual medley and failed to reach the final.

References

Year of birth missing (living people)
Living people
Chinese male medley swimmers
Swimmers from Hunan
Olympic swimmers of China
Swimmers at the 2012 Summer Olympics
Asian Games medalists in swimming
Swimmers at the 2014 Asian Games
Asian Games silver medalists for China
Medalists at the 2014 Asian Games